"A Token of My Extreme", by Frank Zappa, is a song on the 1979 concept album Joe's Garage [Part II].  The main character from this triple-album rock-opera has his mind messed-up by Lucille then "finally does something smart" and "pays a lot of money to L. Ron Hoover and the First Church of Appliantology."

Plot 
Appliantology is shown as an insincere religion, which cooperates with a "malevolent totalitarian regime."  This is an apparent reference to Scientology and its founder L. Ron Hubbard.  Joe, doubting his sanity, asks 'mystical advisor' L. Ron Hoover what his problem is and is told that he is "a latent appliance-fetishist."  Joe asks if it is time "to come out of the closet," and is told that he should "go into the closet". "The Closet" turns out to be a bar in Los Angeles, where he can have "a lot of fun" achieving sexual gratification using machines. The "machines" at The Closet are household appliances with marital aids stuck all over them. Joe is informed that the best appliances speak foreign languages, which leads to the next song, "Stick It Out". This song derives from another piece called "Tush Tush Tush" from 1973.

Analysis 
This song was analyzed in Zappa, and also in Academy Zappa.  In their study of Zappa published in the journal Studies in Musical Theatre, Carr and Hand mention that the song is "a satire of L. Ron Hubbard (1911–86) and the Church of Scientology".  They described the work as "an ironic precursor" to Carlton's Return to the Forbidden Planet.

See also
Scientology in popular culture

References

1979 songs
Songs critical of religion
Frank Zappa songs
Scientology in popular culture
Songs written by Frank Zappa
Song recordings produced by Frank Zappa